American Roulette may refer to:

 American Roulette (album), a 1977 album by Danny O'Keefe
 "American Roulette" (song), a song by Robbie Robertson on the 1987 album Robbie Robertson